The Cherokee County School District manages the 40 schools in Cherokee County, Georgia, United States. The school district's leadership consists of an elected seven-member school board.

The board's chairperson is elected by the county at large and does not represent a single post.

The school board appoints a school superintendent; Dr. Brian V. Hightower has held this position since 2016.

Under Georgia state law, individual board members are not permitted to act individually in any capacity but rather as an entire board based on majority rule.  The superintendent is responsible for all employees in the district.

History

From February 1999, to February 1, 2016 Frank Petruzielo was the superintendent of the district; he retired in the latter year. Brian V. Hightower became superintendent in 2016.

Schools

Elementary schools
Arnold Mill Elementary School
Avery Elementary School
Ball Ground Elementary School
Bascomb Elementary School
Boston Elementary School
Carmel Elementary School
Clark Creek Elementary School
Clayton Elementary School
Free Home Elementary School
Hasty Elementary School
Hickory Flat Elementary School
Holly Spring Elementary School
Indian Knoll Elementary School
Johnston Elementary School
Knox Elementary School
Liberty Elementary School
Little River Elementary School
Macedonia Elementary School
Mountain Road Elementary School
Oak Grove Elementary School
R.M. Moore Elementary School
Sixes Elementary School
Woodstock Elementary School

Middle schools
Creekland Middle School
Dean Rusk Middle School
E.T. Booth Middle School
Freedom Middle School
Marie Archer Teasley Middle School
Mill Creek Middle School
Woodstock Middle School

High schools
Cherokee High School
Creekview High School
Etowah High School
River Ridge High School
Sequoyah High School
Woodstock High School

Other schools
ACE Academy
L.R. Tippens Education Center

References

External links

School districts in Georgia (U.S. state)
Education in Cherokee County, Georgia